The Romantic Novel of the Year Award is an award for romance novels since 1960, presented by Romantic Novelists' Association, and since 2003, the novellas, also won the Love Story of the Year (now RoNA Rose Award).

In 2018, awards were given to men under their own names for the first time in the organisation's 58-year history

Awards

Romantic Novel of the Year a.k.a. RoNA Award a.k.a. Popular Romantic Fiction
This award recognises the best long romance novels.

Winners
     1960: More Than Friendship by Mary Howard (Collins)
     1961: Witches' Sabbath by Paula Allardyce (Hodder & Stoughton)
     1962: Larksbrook by Margaret Maddocks (Hurst & Blackett)
     1963: House Divided by Dorothy M. Cray (Hurst & Blackett)
     1964: Journey from Yesterday by Suzanne Ebel (Collins)
     1965: The Silver Answer by Margaret Maddocks (Hurst & Blackett)
     1967: The Truth Game by Anne Betteridge (Hurst & Blackett)
     1968: The Future Is Forever by Maynah Lewis (Hurst & Blackett)
     1969: Comfort and Keep by Doris E. Smith (Ward Lock)
     1970: Cat On A Broomstick by Joanne Marshall (Herbert Jenkins)
     1970: Thea by Margaret Maddocks (Hurst & Blackett)
     1970: Broken Tapestry by Rona Randall (Hurst & Blackett)
     1971: Flower Of Silence by Joanne Marshall (Harlequin Mills & Boon)
     1972: The Pride Of Innocence by Maynah Lewis (Hurst & Blackett)
     1973: The House Of Kuragin by Constance Heaven (Heinemann)
     1974: The Burning Lamp by Frances Murray (Hodder & Stoughton)
     1975: Vote For A Silk Gown by Jay Allerton (Troubadour)
     1976: The Look Of Innocence by Anna Gilbert (Hodder & Stoughton)
     1976 - Best Modern Award: The Moon Is Square by Margaret Maddocks (Hurst & Blackett)
     1977: Every Man A King by Anne Worboys (Hodder & Stoughton)
     1978: Merlin's Keep by Madeleine Brent (Souvenir)
     1978 - Best Modern Award: It Was The Lark by Catherine Macarthur (Macdonald & Jane)
     1979 - Award Of Special Merit: The Emerald Peacock by Katharine Gordon (Hodder & Stoughton)
     1979: Countess by Josephine Edgar (Macdonald & Jane)
     1980: Parson Harding's Daughter by Joanna Trollope (Hutchinson)
     1980 - Best Modern Award: Mr Rodriguez by Mary Howard (Collins)
     1981: The Red Staircase by Gwendoline Butler (Collins)
     1982: Zemindar by Valerie Fitzgerald (Bodley)
     1983: Magic Flutes by Eva Ibbotson (Century)
     1984: A Highly Respectable Marriage by Sheila Walsh (Hurst & Blackett)
     1985: Sunrise by Rosie Thomas (Piatkus)
     1986: A Song Twice Over by Brenda Jagger (Collins)
     1987: A Better World Than This by Marie Joseph (Century)
     1988: The Juniper Bush by Audrey Howard (Century)
     1989: The Peacock's Feather by Sarah Woodhouse (Century)
     1990: Passing Glory by Reay Tannahill (Century)
     1991: Phantom by Susan Kay (Transworld)
     1992: Sandstorm by June Knox-Mawer (Weidenfeld)
     1993: Emily by Cynthia Harrod-Eagles (Sidgwick & Jackson)
     1994: Consider The Lily by Elizabeth Buchan (Macmillan)
     1995: Change Of Heart by Charlotte Bingham (Doubleday)
     1996: Coming Home by Rosamunde Pilcher (Hodder & Stoughton)
     1997: The Hours Of The Night by Sue Gee (Century)
     1998: Kiss And Kin by Angela Lambert (Bantam)
     1999: Learning To Swim by Clare Chambers (Arrow)
     2000: Dancing In The Dark by Maureen Lee (Orion)
     2001: Someone Like You by Cathy Kelly (HarperCollins)
     2002: The Other Boleyn Girl by Philippa Gregory (HarperCollins)
     2003: Playing James by Sarah Mason (Time Warner)
     2004: Foreign Fruit by Jojo Moyes (Hodder & Stoughton)
     2005: A Good Voyage by Katharine Davies (Chatto & Windus)
     2006: Gardens of Delight by Erica James (Orion)
     2007: Iris & Ruby by Rosie Thomas (HarperCollins)
     2008: Pillow Talk by Freya North (HarperCollins)
     2009: East of the Sun by Julia Gregson (Orion)
     2010: Lost Dogs and Lonely Hearts by Lucy Dillon (Hodder & Stoughton)
     2011: The Last Letter From Your Lover by Jojo Moyes (Hodder & Stoughton)
     2012: Please Don't Stop The Music by Jane Lovering (Choc Lit)
     2013: Welcome to Rosie Hopkin's Sweetshop of Dreams by Jenny Colgan (Sphere, Little Brown)
     2014: A Night on the Orient Express by Veronica Henry (Orion)
     2015: Struck by Joss Stirling (Oxford University Press)
     2016: Letters to the Lost by Iona Grey (Simon & Schuster)
     2017: Love Song by Sophia Bennett (Chicken House)
     2018: This Love by Dani Atkins (Simon & Schuster)
     2019: You Me Everything by Catherine Isaac (Simon & Schuster)
     2020: The Truths and Triumphs of Grace Atherton by Anstey Harris (Simon & Schuster)
     2021: Sing Me a Secret by Julie Houston (Aria, Head of Zeus)
     2022: The River Between Us by Liz Fenwick (HQ HarperCollins)

Love Story of the Year a.k.a. RoNA Rose Award  a.k.a. Shorter Romantic Novel
This award (formerly the Love Story of the Year) recognises the best in category and shorter romance, serials in magazines are also eligible.

Winners
     2003: Illusion by Julia Wild (Heartline)
     2004: A Damnable Rogue by Anne Herries (Harlequin Mills & Boon)
     2005: A Family of His Own by Liz Fielding (Harlequin Mills & Boon)
     2006: Contracted: Corporate Wife by Jessica Hart (Harlequin Mills & Boon)
     2007: Marrying Max by Nell Dixon (DC Thomson)
     2008: Breakfast at Giovanni's by Kate Hardy (Harlequin Mills & Boon)
     2009: Mistress: Hired for the Billionaire's Pleasure by India Grey (Harlequin Mills & Boon)
     2010: Animal Instincts by Nell Dixon (Little Black Dress)
     2011: The Piratical Miss Ravenhurst by Louise Allen (Harlequin Historicals)
     2012: The Dangerous Lord Darrington by Sarah Mallory (HMB Historical Regency)
     2013: Beneath the Major's Scars by Sarah Mallory (HMB Historical Regency)
     2014: Bound by a Baby by Kate Hardy (Harlequin Mills & Boon)
     2015: Scandal’s Virgin by Louise Allen (Harlequin Mills & Boon)
     2016: Doctor... To Duchess? by Annie O'Neil (Harlequin Mills & Boon)
     2017: Christmas in the Boss’s Castle by Scarlet Wilson (Harlequin Mills & Boon)
     2018: Christmas at the Little Village School by Jane Lovering (Choc Lit)
     2019: Secret Baby, Second Chance by Jane Godman (Mills & Boon)
     2020: Miss Amelia’s Mistletoe Marquess by Jenni Fletcher (Mills & Boon Historical)
     2021: A Will, a Wish and a Wedding by Kate Hardy (Mills & Boon True Love)

Contemporary Romantic Novel of the Year
This award recognises the best in category for mainstream romantic novels set in the present world or society.

Winners
     2012: Summer of Love by Katie Fforde (Century)
     2013: Recipe for Love by Katie Fforde (Century)
     2014: A Night on the Orient Express by Veronica Henry (Orion)
     2015: A Hundred Pieces of Me by Lucy Dillon (Hodder & Stoughton)
     2016: The Wedding Cake Tree by Melanie Hudson (Choc Lit)
     2017: Summer at the Comfort Food Cafe by Debbie Johnson (HarperImpulse)
     2018: Together by Julie Cohen (Orion)
     2019: One Thousand Stars and You by Isabelle Broom (Michael Joseph)
     2020: A Summer to Remember by Sue Moorcroft (Avon, HarperCollins)
     2021: My One True North by Milly Johnson (Simon & Schuster)

Historical Romantic Novel of the Year
This award recognises the best in category for a romantic novel set pre 1960.

Winners
     2012: Highland Storms by Christina Courtenay (Choc Lit)
     2013: The Apothecary's Daughter by Charlotte Betts
     2014: The Gilded Fan by Christina Courtenay (Choc Lit)
     2015: The Girl Who Came Home by Hazel Gaynor (William Morrow)
     2016: Letters to the Lost by Iona Grey (Simon & Schuster)
     2017: It Was Only Ever You by Kate Kerrigan (Head of Zeus)
     2018: The Designer by Marius Gabriel (Lake Union Publishing)
     2019: The Temptation of Gracie by Santa Montefiore (Simon & Schuster)
     2020: The French Photographer by Natasha Lester (Sphere)
     2021: Rags-to-Riches Wife by Catherine Tinley (Mills & Boon Historical)

Romantic Comedy Novel
This award recognises the best in category for a romantic novel intended to be consistently humorous or amusing.

Winners
     2012: Please Don't Stop The Music by Jane Lovering (Choc Lit)
     2013: Welcome to Rosie Hopkin's Sweetshop of Dreams by Jenny Colgan (Sphere, Little Brown)
     2014: It's Raining Men by Milly Johnson (Simon & Schuster)
     2015: Just a Girl, Standing in Front of a Boy by Lucy-Anne Holmes (Sphere) 
     2016: Afternoon Tea at the Sunflower Cafe by Milly Johnson (Simon & Schuster)
     2017: Out of Practice  by Penny Parkes (Simon & Schuster)
     2018: The Summer Seaside Kitchen by Jenny Colgan (Sphere/Little, Brown)
     2019: Not Just For Christmas by Natalie Cox (Orion)
     2020: A Question of Us by Mary Jayne Baker (Aria Fiction, Head of Zeus)
     2021: Sunny Days and Sea Breezes by Carole Matthews (Sphere, Little, Brown)

Epic Romantic Novel of the Year
This award recognises the best in category for romantic novels that have a broad and sweeping scope. May be either contemporary or historical and may include time-slip.

Winners
     2012: The Kashmir Shawl by Rosie Thomas (HarperCollins)
     2013: Dearest Rose by Rowan Coleman
     2014: The Fever Tree by Jennifer McVeigh (Penguin)
     2015: Pieces of You by Ella Harper (Avon)
     2016: The Secrets We Share by Emma Hannigan (Headline Review)
     2017: Little Girl Lost by Janet Gover (Choc Lit)
     2018: This Love by Dani Atkins (Simon & Schuster)

Young Adult Romantic Novel
This award recognises the best in category for a romantic novel in which the main characters are teenagers or young adults.

Winners
     2012: Dark Ride by Caroline Green (Piccadilly Press)
     2013: Witchstruck by Victoria Lamb
     2014: Linked by Imogen Howson (Quercus)
     2015: Struck by Joss Stirling (Oxford University Press)
     2016: Crow Mountain by Lucy Inglis (Chicken House)
     2017: Love Song by Sophia Bennett (Chicken House)
     2018: Ten Birthdays by Kerry Wilkinson (Bookouture)

Paranormal or Speculative Romantic Novel  a.k.a. Fantasy Romantic Novel
This award recognises the best in category for a romantic novel that may be paranormal, fantasy, science fiction, time-slip etc.

Winners
     2017: Max Seventeen by Kate Johnson (Independent)
     2018: The Other Us by Fiona Harper (HQ)
     2019: Living in the Past by Jane Lovering (Choc Lit)
     2020: Queenie Malone's Paradise Hotel by Ruth Hogan (Two Roads)
     2021: Echoes of the Rune by Christina Courtenay (Headline Review)

Debut Romantic Novel
This award recognises the best romantic novel by a first-time author.

Winners
     2019: The Rules of Seeing by Joe Heap (HarperCollins)
     2020: The Forgotten Village by Lorna Cook (Avon, HarperCollins)
     2021: The Authenticity Project by Clare Pooley (Bantam Press)

Romantic Thriller
This award recognises the best in category for a romantic thriller.

Winners
     2020: Knowing You by Samantha Tonge (Canelo)
     2021: The House by the Sea by Louise Douglas (Boldwood Books)

Romantic Saga
This award recognises the best in category for the best romantic novel featuring saga elements of characters overcoming social adversity, usually set in the past.

Winners
     2020: The Street of Broken Dreams by Tania Crosse (Aria Fiction, Head of Zeus)
     2021: Bobby’s War by Shirley Mann (Zaffre, Bonnier Books UK)

References 

Romantic fiction awards
British literary awards
Awards established in 1960
1960 establishments in the United Kingdom